Baieidō （Japanese language: 梅栄堂） is a Japanese incense company established in 1657, located in Sakai, Osaka Prefecture, It is one of the oldest traditional incense makers in Japan.

History

Baieido dates back to the Muromachi period (1338-1573) in Japanese history. During this period, the founder of Baieido, Kakuuemon Yamatoya, became a wholesaler of medicinal herbs in Sakai city. Sakai was a well-known trading port in ancient Japan in which incense trading was in high demand. In 1657, the founder named himself "Jinkoya Sakubei" and specialized in selling incense ingredients and incense sticks. "Jinkoya" (Aloeswood trader) was a name peculiar to Sakai, only medicinal wholesalers who specialized in incense were authorized to use this name. In the time-honored traditions of Jinkoya Sakubei, Baieido has dedicated itself to making incense for over 300 years. The method and recipes have been handed down from generation to generation in an unbroken secret oral tradition. The name "Baieidō" is derived from the three characters bai, ei, and dō. Bai means "plum tree"; ei means "prosperity"; dō means "shrine orsStore"

Traditional incense
The following are the main incenses made by Baieidō.  Their staple incense is "Kōbunboku" （好文木）. Several of the other incenses are based on this incense.

Agarwood
Baieidō also pioneered research into the history of Agarwood (also called aloeswood). Agarwood refers to a resin that develops from some trees in the Aquilaria genus that are infected with a fungus. The tree produces a resin to protect itself against the fungus. This resin is agarwood. Japanese incense often uses 2 common terms for agarwood: jinkō （沈香） and kyara （伽羅）. Jinkō refers to any kind of agarwood. Kyara refers to one specific type of agarwood.

Japan has been using raw woods in incense since the Kamakura period (1185–1333).   Incense ceremonies are mentioned in The Tale of Genji in the early 11th century. Much later, possibly in the Edo period (1603–1867), different agarwoods began to be labeled with different names. The different agarwoods were given the category name "Rikkoku" (六国), literally meaning "Six Countries". Kyara is one of these 6 kinds of agarwood.

 Kyara
Kyara is thought to have originally come from Vietnam.

 Manaban
It is unknown where in Southeast Asia the original Manaban agarwood came from.

 Sasora
The original location of Sasora agarwood is also unknown. It possibly came from Assam, India.

 Rakoku
Rakoku was from somewhere in modern Thailand or Laos.

 Sumontara
Sumontara came from Sumatra, Indonesia.

 Managa
Managa came from Malacca, Malaysia.

Most incense companies that make sets of "Rikkoku" replace these traditional agarwoods with available agarwoods that have similar scent properties to the original agarwoods. Baieidō has named the following agarwoods that are used in their incenses.

Kokonoe no Kumo （九重の雲）
This agarwood is from Indonesia.

Tsukigase （月が瀬）
This agarwood comes from Vietnam. 
 
Ogurayama （小倉山）
Ogurayama agarwood comes from Vietnam.

Hakusui （白水）
Hakusui agarwood also comes from Vietnam.

See also
 Kōdō (Japanese Incense Ceremony)

References

External links
Baieidō's Website
Rikkoku ("Six Countries" of agarwood) 
Baieido USA
Japanese Incense by Kyozaburo Nakata & David Oller

Japanese incense companies
1657 establishments in Japan
Companies established in 1657